Events in the year 1994 in Mexico.

Incumbents

Federal government 
 President: Carlos Salinas de Gortari (until November 30), Ernesto Zedillo (starting December 1)
 Interior Secretary (SEGOB): Patrocinio González Garrido/Jorge Carpizo McGregor/Esteban Moctezuma
 Secretary of Foreign Affairs (SRE): Manuel Camacho Solís/José Ángel Gurría
 Communications Secretary (SCT): Emilio Gamboa Patrón/Guillermo Ortiz Martínez/Carlos Ruiz Sacristán
 Secretary of Defense (SEDENA): Antonio Riviello Bazán/Enrique Cervantes Aguirre
 Secretary of Navy: Luis Carlos Ruano Angulo/José Ramón Lorenzo Franco
 Secretary of Labor and Social Welfare: Arsenio Farell Cubillas/Manuel Gómez Peralta/Santiago Oñate Laborde
 Secretary of Welfare: Carlos Rojas Gutiérrez
 Secretary of Public Education: Fernando Solana Morales/José Ángel Pescador/Fausto Alzati/Miguel Limón Rojas
 Tourism Secretary (SECTUR): Silvia Hernández Enríquez
 Secretary of the Environment (SEMARNAT): Guillermo Jiménez Morales/Julia Carabias Lillo
 Secretary of Health (SALUD): Jesús Kumate Rodríguez/Juan Ramón De La Fuente

Supreme Court

 President of the Supreme Court: Ulises Schmill Ordóñez

Governors

 Aguascalientes: Otto Granados Roldán, (Institutional Revolutionary Party, PRI)
 Baja California: Ernesto Ruffo Appel, (National Action Party PAN)
 Baja California Sur: Guillermo Mercado Romero
 Campeche: Jorge Salomón Azar García
 Chiapas: Elmar Setzer Marseille/Javier López Moreno/Eduardo Robledo Rincón
 Chihuahua: Francisco Barrio (PAN)
 Coahuila: Rogelio Montemayor Seguy (PRI)
 Colima: Carlos de la Madrid Virgen
 Durango: Maximiliano Silerio Esparza
 Guanajuato: Carlos Medina Plascencia
 Guerrero: Rubén Figueroa Alcocer (PRI)
 Hidalgo: Jesús Murillo Karam
 Jalisco: Carlos Rivera Aceves
 State of Mexico: Emilio Chuayffet (PRI)
 Michoacán: Ausencio Chávez Hernández
 Morelos
Antonio Riva Palacio (PRI), until May 17.
Jorge Carrillo Olea (PRI), starting May 18. 
 Nayarit: Rigoberto Ochoa Zaragoza
 Nuevo León: Sócrates Rizzo (PRI)
 Oaxaca: Diódoro Carrasco Altamirano (PRI)
 Puebla: Manuel Bartlett Díaz (PRI)
 Querétaro: Enrique Burgos García (PRI)
 Quintana Roo: Mario Villanueva Madrid (PRI)
 San Luis Potosí: Horacio Sánchez Unzueta (PRI)
 Sinaloa: Renato Vega Alvarado (PRI)
 Sonora: Manlio Fabio Beltrones Rivera (PRI)
 Tabasco: Manuel Gurría Ordóñez (PRI)
 Tamaulipas: Manuel Cavazos Lerma (PRI)	
 Tlaxcala: José Antonio Álvarez Lima (PRD)
 Veracruz: Patricio Chirinos Calero (PRD)
 Yucatán: Ricardo Ávila Heredia/Federico Granja Ricalde (PRI)
 Zacatecas: Arturo Romo Gutiérrez (PRI)
Regent of Mexico City
Manuel Aguilera Gomez
Oscar Espinosa Villarreal

Events 
 January 1 
 The North American Free Trade Agreement (NAFTA) between Mexico, Canada and the United States goes into effect
 The Zapatista Army of National Liberation goes public in response to NAFTA.
 January 16 – The Apostolic Nunciature to Mexico, Girolamo Prigione, has a secret meeting with drug lord Benjamín Arellano Félix, who was implicated in the assassination of Cardinal Juan Jesús Posadas six months earlier. He had met with Ramón Arellano Félix six weeks earlier.
 March 23 – Luis Donaldo Colosio presidential candidate for the PRI is assassinated in Tijuana, Baja California.
 August 11 – Hurricane John starts in southern Mexico
 August 21 – Presidential elections
 September 28 – José Francisco Ruiz Massieu, brother-in-law of President Carlos Salinas de Gortari, former governor of Guerrero, and leader of the Institutional Revolutionary Party is assassinated.
 October 11 – Hurricane Rosa kills four in Nayarit and Durango
 December 1 – Ernesto Zedillo takes office as President of Mexico.
The activity prompted the evacuation of nearby towns and scientists to begin monitoring for an eruption.
 December 
 economic crisis in Mexico with the peso losing a third of its value
 The Fobaproa is applied in response to the economic crisis
 El Barzón is created in response to the economic crisis

Awards
Belisario Domínguez Medal of Honor – Jaime Sabines

Popular culture

Sports 
 July 5 – Mexico loses 1–3 versus Bulgaria and is eliminated from the Football World Cup 1994

Music

Film

 June 6 – The XXXVI edition of the Ariel Award by the Mexican Academy of Film takes place at the Palacio de Bellas Artes in Mexico City
 El callejón de los milagros of Jorge Fons
 Bienvenido-Welcome of Gabriel Retes
 Dos crímenes of Roberto Sneider
 Hasta morir of Fernando Sariñana
 El jardín del edén of María Novaro
 La reina de la noche of Arturo Ripstein
 Mujeres insumisas of Alberto Isaac
 Dulces compañías of Oscar Blancarte
 Un volcán con lava de hielo (short) of Valentina Leduc
 El árbol de la música (short) of Sabina Berman & Isabel Tardán
 Del otro lado del mar (short) of Marcela Arteaga

Literature

TV

Telenovelas
 Dos mujeres, un camino, on Televisa
 Marimar, on Televisa
 Volver a empezar, on Televisa

Births
 August 13 – Andrea Meza, model, Miss Universe 2020 
 October 17 – Alejandra Valencia, archer
 November 8 – Víctor Hugo Saldaña Gutiérrez, footballer; (d. 2017).

Deaths
 March 23 – Luis Donaldo Colosio (43), candidate to the Presidency of Mexico (b. 1950)
 September 28 – José Francisco Ruiz Massieu (48), politician, assassinated (b. 1946)

References

 
Mexico